Davalillo is a Spanish surname. Notable people with the surname include:

Vic Davalillo (born 1936), Venezuelan baseball player
Yo-Yo Davalillo (1931–2013), Venezuelan baseball player and manager

Spanish-language surnames